Keep On Lovin' is an album by American jazz organist Lonnie Smith recorded in 1976 and released on the Groove Merchant label.

Reception 

Allmusic's Jason Ankeny said: "Lonnie Smith embraces fusion for Keep On Lovin' , forsaking his signature Hammond B-3 for the Fender Rhodes. ... Purists will no doubt cry foul, but in truth the record's electric sheen isn't so far removed from his Blue Note heyday, and the energy and creativity of his playing demand respect regardless of context".

Track listing
All compositions by Lonnie Smith except where noted
 "Keep On Lovin'" (Jerry Friedman) – 6:00
 "Sizzle Stick" (Brad Baker, Lance Quinn) – 5:57
 "Lean Meat" (Baker, Quinn) – 6:16
 "What I Want" – 5:58
 "Filet-o-Sole" (Bob Babbitt) – 5:44
 "No Tears Tomorrow" – 5:08

Personnel
Lonnie Smith – Fenderhodes, keyboards, vocals
Randy Brecker, Alan Rubin – trumpet
Barry Rogers – trombone
David Taylor – bass trombone
Fred Griffen – French horn
George Young – alto saxophone, flute
Joe Lovano – tenor saxophone
Lew Del Gatto – baritone saxophone, flute
Jerry Friedman, Lance Quinn – guitar, arranger
Bob Babbitt – bass, arranger
Will Lee – bass 
Rick Marotta – drums
Jimmy Maelen – percussion
Fredrick Buldrini, Guy Lumia, Harold Kohan, Jesse Levy, Joe Randazzo, Julian Barker, Norman Carr, Richard Locker, Richard Maximoff, Richard Sortomme, Tony Posk – string section

References

Groove Merchant albums
Lonnie Smith (organist) albums
1976 albums
Albums produced by Sonny Lester